Leslie Coutterand (born October 1984) is a French actress, model, writer, director and documentary filmmaker from Chamonix, France. Before graduating the drama college at Cours Florent in 2008, she was cast as Alexandra in the television series Deja Vu which filmed in Vietnam and Singapore. A series of TV and film roles followed, and then in 2011 she was cast as a series regular in the French police drama, Julie Lescaut as Mado. In 2013, she was cast alongside Stanley Tucci, Marcia Gay Harden, Taye Diggs, and Rebecca Romijn in the film Larry Gaye: Renegade Male Flight Attendant.

Coutterand is also a model and has been featured in high-profile and international campaigns for clients including Nivea, Head and Shoulders, Joes Jeans and Louis Vuitton. In 2015 she was cast as the lead model in a nine-minute-long commercial for Persol Sunglasses directed by Bret Easton Ellis.

In 2016, she and creative partner Marine Billet began filming their documentary I Love Therefore I Am. She spoke about the film, which is a global investigation into the concept of love and its impact on the world, at the TED conference in Lyon France in December 2016.

Highlighted acting credits

References 

1984 births
Living people
French actresses
French documentary filmmakers
French female models
Women documentary filmmakers